DTPL may refer to:

 Datamax Ticket Printer Language, a page description language
 A version of the programming language Filetab